The Nokia N90 is a smartphone, announced as part of Nokia's then-new line of multimedia devices, Nseries, on April 27, 2005. It had a unique swivel design encompassing four 'modes'. It has two displays and has a camera with Carl Zeiss optics and integrated flash, and can record video with audio. The screen can be swiveled 270° to let the phone be handled more like a conventional video camera. The camera lens can also be swiveled. The phone has no vibration feature. The 2.1-inch display has a pixel density of 259 ppi, which made it incredibly sharp and the crispest Nokia screen at the time, and continued to be joint-highest with the N80, E60 and E70 for four years, before being beaten by the Nokia N900 in 2009 with 267 ppi. The Nokia N90 can print with some printers over USB or over Bluetooth.

It uses the Series 60 2nd Edition, Feature Pack 3 user interface on top of the Symbian OS 8.1a operating system. Later revisions also shipped with Version 2 of the Nokia Lifeblog software. The Nokia N90 began shipping in Q2 2005 in most markets, but didn't appear in the US until Q1 2006. It was succeeded by the Nokia N93.

The N90 was usually bundled with a 64 MB or 128 MB DV-RS-MMC memory card and a USB data transfer cable.

Complaints about the N90 include high price, large size, weight, and "chunkiness."

Specification sheet

In popular culture

The N90 was featured in Tom Clancy's Splinter Cell: Double Agent as a billboard.

The N90 was shown in an episode of NCIS.

See also 
 List of Nokia products

References

External links 

 Twice The Honor: Nokia N90 and Nokia N91 Win A "Best Of What's New ... 
 Award-Winning Nokia N90 Now Shipping in the US 
 Nokia N90 voted European Media Phone of the Year
 Official Nokia N90 Product Page
 N Series Talk  Nokia N Series Forums and Community
 Official N90 Blog

Reviews 
 InfoSync World
 Mobile Review
 3G.co.uk
 Mobile Burn
 Cooltech Zone
 Camera Phones Spot
 Mobique

Nokia smartphones
Mobile phones introduced in 2005
Nokia Nseries

de:Nokia Nseries#Nokia N90